Maganda is a surname. Notable people with the surname include:

Alejandro Gómez Maganda (1910–1984), Mexican politician
Julius Wandera Maganda (born 1971), Ugandan politician
Miguel Maganda (born 1980), Mexican film director

Surnames of African origin